Grand Haven is a city within the U.S. state of Michigan and the county seat of Ottawa County. Grand Haven is located on the eastern shore of Lake Michigan at the mouth of the Grand River, for which it is named.  As of the 2010 census, Grand Haven had a population of 10,412. It is part of the Grand Rapids Metropolitan Area, which had a population of 1,027,703 in 2014. The city is home to the Grand Haven Memorial Airpark (3GM) and is located just north of Grand Haven Charter Township.

History
The Potawatomi and Ottawa Native Americans lived in the area for centuries and used the river as a trade route into the interior of Michigan. Some of the long cultures of the Ottawa tribe is being revealed through the excavation of archeological artifacts.

The city dates its European-American founding to French colonial settlers. A fur trading outpost called Gabagouache was first established by Madeline La Framboise and her husband Joseph.

After the War of 1812, this area became more settled by Americans. A trading post was established here about 1821 by the American Fur Company, but the first permanent resident was a Presbyterian minister, William Montague Ferry, who founded in 1834 the first area church. Residents named the town as "Grand Haven" in 1835. Sheldon Tannery was founded in 1838, developing to process leathers from the fur trade and cattle. The second church was organized in 1850. Ferry founded the city's first bank in 1851 in the Ferry & Son building on Harbor Drive. He also started a school, Ferry Elementary, which continues to operate. The city was incorporated in 1867.

In the mid-to-late 19th century, Grand Haven developed as a logging, lumber mill, and shipping town, as well as a shipbuilding center.

The city was served by the Grand Trunk Railway, which ran along the waterfront near the river. Its depot and offices have been adapted for use as a historical museum. The Story and Clark Piano Company built pianos in the city from 1900 to 1984. The smokestack at the piano factory collapsed during the Southern Great Lakes Derecho of 1998. In August 2006, Eagle-Ottawa Leather Co., which developed from the 1838 Sheldon Tannery, announced it would close its local operations that year.

Given the importance of shipping and water trade to the city, the Grand Haven Lighthouses were built in 1839 on the south pier, to mark the most navigable channel into the river. The current lighthouses, painted red, were built in 1875 (outer light) and 1905 (inner). They are connected by a lighted catwalk, which runs along the pier to the shore.

George "Baby Face" Nelson and Homer Van Meter, who became notorious 1930s criminals, committed their first bank robbery at a Grand Haven bank. Nelson teamed up with Eddie Bentz to rob the People's Saving Bank on the corner of 3rd St. and Washington Ave. Bullet holes can still be found in some of the neighboring brick buildings.

Business and tourism

The Grand Haven port community is an active beach resort with boating, fishing, sailing, biking, skating etc. along with connecting campgrounds and recreational areas. Grand Haven is a destination point for residents of inland cities of West Michigan, as well as many from the other side of the state. Grand Rapidians regularly visit to take advantage of the close proximity to the Lake Michigan beaches, State campgrounds, restaurants, bars, attractions with many even owning cottages in the area as their home away from home.

Grand Haven State Park contains beaches which, in summer, water temperatures reach the low 70s°F (2013 had 19 days in the 70s), bringing tens of thousands of visitors as a boon to the local economy.

The state park also includes a campground on Lake Michigan, near the pier and lighthouses. In addition, the city features a ski park (Mulligan's Hollow Ski Bowl) and a skate park. The waterfront locations bring tourists from all over the state and region for activities which include, boating, sailing, jet skiing, tubing, and wind surfing.

Grand Haven is home to the United States Coast Guard's "Sector Field Office Grand Haven." The first Coast Guard presence in the city was in 1924. The Coast Guard cutter Escanaba was based in the city until the Second World War. After it was sunk by a U-boat of Nazi Germany's Kriegsmarine, the citizens of Grand Haven raised more than $1,000,000 in bonds to build a replacement cutter bearing the same name; several pieces of wreckage remain displayed on the city's waterfront. Grand Haven hosts the annual Coast Guard Festival, a celebration based on Coast Guard Day, which draws U.S. and Canadian vessels along with parades of bands and other activities, including a memorial to the 101 sailors lost in the Escanaba sinking. The yearly attendance for this event exceeds 300,000 people over the two-week period of the festival. Grand Haven is the first city officially designated as Coast Guard City, USA by an act of Congress signed by President Bill Clinton. The act was Public Law 105-383 enacted by the United States Congress and signed by the president on November 13, 1998.

The Grand Haven Musical Fountain was built on the opposite bank of the Grand River from the city center in 1962. It plays nightly during the tourist season. When it was built, it was the world's largest such fountain. Today, the overall largest fountain is in Las Vegas.

The City of Grand Haven has many parks. These include a large section of beach on Lake Michigan, a ski hill, and multiple boat launches. Duncan Woods (officially Duncan Memorial Park) is one of the largest sections of unspoiled virgin forest in the entire lower peninsula of Michigan. In these woods, visitors get to see what Michigan looked like before the deforestation of the lumber era.

Technology
Grand Haven has been one of many technology leaders in West Michigan and throughout the country, having been featured in the national media, including on ABC, in PCWorld, ComputerWorld and Forbes magazine. The city was the first municipality in the country to feature a citywide wireless internet service. In 2004, the city started offering wireless internet service for residents, businesses and visitors for payment on varying cost-time scales.

Geography

Education

Primary and secondary schools
Grand Haven Area Public Schools
Grand Haven High School
Central High School
White Pines Intermediate School
Lakeshore Middle School
Voyagers School
Rosy Mound Elementary
Robinson Elementary
Peach Plains Elementary
Mary A. White Elementary
Lake Hills Elementary
Griffin Elementary
Ferry Elementary
Private schools
Grand Haven Christian School
St. John's Lutheran School

Major highways
  runs through the city along a boulevard and utilizes a drawbridge over the Grand River at the northern city limit.
  runs easterly from US 31 in Ferrysburg, through Spring Lake and toward I-96.

Demographics

2010 census
As of the census of 2010, there were 10,412 people, 4,769 households, and 2,721 families living in the city. The racial makeup of the city was 95.0% White, 0.7% African American, 0.9% Native American, 1.0% Asian, 0.4% from other races, and 1.9% from two or more races. Hispanic or Latino of any race were 2.4% of the population.

There were 4,769 households, of which 24.8% had children under the age of 18 living with them, 42.1% were married couples living together, 11.0% had a female householder with no husband present, 3.9% had a male householder with no wife present, and 42.9% were non-families. 37.2% of all households were made up of individuals, and 14.9% had someone living alone who was 65 years of age or older. The average household size was 2.15 and the average family size was 2.82.

The median age in the city was 42.9 years. 20.7% of residents were under the age of 18; 7.6% were between the ages of 18 and 24; 24.2% were from 25 to 44; 28.5% were from 45 to 64; and 19.1% were 65 years of age or older. The gender makeup of the city was 47.4% male and 52.6% female.

2000 census
As of the census of 2000, there were 11,168 people, 4,979 households, and 2,892 families living in the city. The racial makeup of the city was 96.35% White, 0.45% African American, 0.56% Native American, 0.87% Asian, 0.02% Pacific Islander, 0.40% from other races, and 1.35% from two or more races. Hispanic or Latino of any race were 1.58% of the population.

There were 4,979 households, out of which 23.8% had children under the age of 18 living with them, 45.5% were married couples living together, 9.7% had a female householder with no husband present, and 41.9% were non-families. 34.8% of all households were made up of individuals, and 14.2% had someone living alone who was 65 years of age or older. The average household size was 2.17 and the average family size was 2.81.

In the city, the population was spread out, with 20.1% under the age of 18, 9.2% from 18 to 24, 27.6% from 25 to 44, 23.4% from 45 to 64, and 19.6% who were 65 years of age or older. The median age was 40 years. For every 100 females, there were 89.5 males. For every 100 females age 18 and over, there were 86.0 males.

Local media
The area is served by the daily newspaper Grand Haven Tribune, headquartered in Grand Haven. The Tribune has a circulation of 8,813.

The city has several radio stations, including WGHN (AM), WGHN-FM, WMPA, Oldies 94.9, and WAWL.

Notable people

Howard Bailey, Major League Baseball pitcher
 Neal Ball, first player in Major League Baseball to execute an unassisted triple play (accomplished in 1909)
 BØRNS, indie-pop singer-songwriter, EP "Candy"
 Dan Bylsma, former NHL player, Stanley Cup winner (coaching), former head coach of Pittsburgh Penguins and Buffalo Sabres, former assistant coach of Detroit Red Wings
Thomas W. Ferry, U.S. Senator who served as President pro tempore of the United States Senate 
William Montague Ferry  a Presbyterian minister, missionary, and community leader who founded several settlements in Ottawa County.

References

External links

 Grand Haven Area Convention and Visitors Bureau
 City of Grand Haven
 Grand Haven Chamber of Commerce

 
Michigan populated places on Lake Michigan
County seats in Michigan
Cities in Ottawa County, Michigan
United States Coast Guard bases
1867 establishments in Michigan
Populated places established in 1867